Gettysburg: A Novel of the Civil War is an alternate history novel written by Newt Gingrich and William R. Forstchen.It was published in 2003.  It is the first part in a trilogy in which the next books are respectively Grant Comes East and Never Call Retreat.

Plot summary
The story takes place in 1863 when Robert E. Lee and the Army of Northern Virginia are victorious at the Battle of Gettysburg instead of the United States. Instead of attacking the Union line on July 2, 1863, Lee conducts a broad turning movement and forces the Army of the Potomac to attack him in a favorable position. Gettysburg becomes something of a footnote in the main battle, which takes place at Union Mills in Maryland. The defeat at Union Mills is a grave setback to the United States, but it by no means spells the end of the war or determines its outcome, and the United States still has a lot of fight in it.

In this, the book takes an opposing view to the classic Bring the Jubilee published in 1953—precisely fifty years before the present book—which assumes that a defeat in Gettysburg would have led to a complete defeat and catastrophic collapse of the North.

Historical figures

Union

 President Abraham Lincoln
 Secretary of War Edwin Stanton
 General-in-Chief Henry Halleck
 Commanding General George Meade
 General Winfield Scott Hancock
 General John Buford
 General William Gamble
 General Herman Haupt
 General Henry Jackson Hunt
 General Daniel Butterfield
 General Daniel Sickles
 General John Reynolds
 General Adelbert Ames
 General Oliver O. Howard
 General Gouverneur K. Warren
 General Strong Vincent
 General Carl Schurz
 General Abner Doubleday
 Colonel Hiram Berdan
 Colonel Joshua Chamberlain
 Captain Hubert Dilger

Confederacy

 Commanding General Robert E. Lee
 General James Longstreet
 General Richard S. Ewell
 General Jubal Early
 General Bradley Johnson
 General A. P. Hill
 General John Bell Hood
 General J. E. B. Stuart
 General Henry Heth
 General Jerome B. Robertson
 General George Pickett
 General Lewis Armistead
 General George T. Anderson
 General Evander M. Law
 General Isaac R. Trimble
 General Robert E. Rodes
 Colonel Edward Porter Alexander
 Major Walter H. Taylor
 Major Jedediah Hotchkiss
 Major John Williamson

See also

 American Civil War alternate histories

References

2003 American novels
American alternate history novels
American Civil War alternate histories
Collaborative novels
Fiction set in 1863
Gettysburg campaign
Novels by Newt Gingrich
Novels by William R. Forstchen
Novels set during the American Civil War
Thomas Dunne Books books
Union Mills, Maryland